Der kleine Mann (English: "The Small Man") is a German television series that aired for 8 episodes in 2009. The show was created by Ralf Husmann and starred Bjarne Mädel as a store clerk who gains sudden fame when he appears in a television commercial.

See also
List of German television series

External links
 

2009 German television series debuts
2009 German television series endings
German-language television shows
ProSieben original programming